Tafresh University (Persian: دانشگاه تفرش), formerly named Tafresh Amir Kabir University of Technology (TAUT) is an educational university located in Tafresh, Iran. Now, about 3,000 students are studying in this university.

History
It was early 1987 that the first step for establishing a university in the city of Tafresh was taken by the university development council. The goal was training professionals and researchers in order to enrich the necessary human resources in need of the country. Finally in May 1987 the construction of Tafresh University was initiated owing to the efforts spent by Dr Heydari.

In 1988, Tafresh University began academic activities by admitting 53 students in applied mathematics. At that time Amir Kabir University was the executor, and TU was a unit of that institution.

With the permission of the development council for higher education, Tafresh University was  elevated to an independent university in 2005.

Academics
Tafresh University was founded to constitute 4 research centres and 17 faculties with 45 academic majors available at undergraduate and graduate levels.  At the time being Tafresh University hosts 2,130 students in 7 academic disciplines. Of those, 1,834 students study in 15 academic majors at the B.Sc. level, 294 students study in 17 academic majors at the M.Sc. level, and 12 PhD students study in 2 academic majors at the PhD level.  Due to the formulated development programme, the number of disciplines offered by Tafresh University shall increase.

Presently, Tafresh university has 70 full-time academic staff members. They comprise the following faculties:
 Electrical engineering
 Industrial engineering
 Mechanical engineering
 Civil and Geodesy engineering
 Chemical engineering
 Mathematics
 Physics

The university offers the following academic majors at the B.Sc. level:
 Mechanical engineering – Mechanics of fluids and heat
 Electrical engineering – Electronics
 Electrical engineering – Control
 Electrical engineering – Power
 Civil engineering – Surveying
 Civil engineering – Civil
 Industrial engineering – Industrial technology
 Chemical engineering
 Mathematics – Pure
 Mathematics – Applied
 Mathematics and its applications
 Physics

Academic majors at the M.Sc. level are:
 Civil engineering – Surveying – Photogrammetry
 Civil engineering – Structure
 Civil engineering -  Soil Mechanics and Foundation
 Industrial engineering – Management systems
 Industrial engineering – Industry
 Electrical engineering – Electronics
 Electrical engineering – Control
 Electrical engineering – Power
 Mechanical engineering – Manufacturing
 Applied Mathematics – Numerical Analysis
 Pure Mathematics – Geometry
 Physics –  Fundamental Particles and Field theory
 Physics – Nuclear

The university offers the following academic fields at the PhD level:
 Electrical engineering - Control
 Mathematics – Algebraic graph theory

See also
Higher education in Iran
Science in Iran

References

External links
Official Website Of Tafresh University
Student administration portal of Tafresh University

Universities in Iran
Educational institutions established in 1987
Tafresh
Buildings and structures in Markazi Province
Education in Markazi Province
1987 establishments in Iran